Saravali may refer to:

 Saravali, a village in Greece
 Sārāvalī, an Indian astrological treatise
 Saravali, Bhiwandi, a village in Maharashtra, India
 Saravali, Dahanu, a village in Maharashtra, India